The Dongshan Island Campaign was a battle fought on Dongshan Island, Fujian between the Nationalists and the Communists during the Chinese Civil War when the Nationalists unsuccessfully attempted to retake the island from the Communists.  The campaign was the last and largest battle between the two sides after the Nationalists retreated to Taiwan. After this defeat, the Nationalists realized that it would never be practical to launch a large scale counterattack against the mainland on a similar scale again. Instead, the Nationalist strikes against mainland China were reduced to limited infiltration and skirmishes.

Order of battle
Attackers: Republic of China Army (ROC Army)
Two army divisions
One paratroop division (with two brigades totaling 2,000 men)
13 naval vessels
30+ motorized junks
Defenders: People's Liberation Army (PLA)
The 80th Public Security Regiment and militia (1,200 men)
The 272nd Regiment of the 31st Army
A regiment of the 28th Army
A regiment of the 41st Army
The 91st Division of the 31st Army

Prelude
Shortly before dawn on 16 July 1953, the Nationalist commander Hu Lien (胡琏) sailed with his troops in 13 naval vessels and more than 30 motorized junks toward Dongshan Island, Fujian, attempting to retake the island from the Communists who took the island from the Nationalists three years earlier in the Battle of Dongshan Island.  In addition to two regular army divisions, an elite paratroop division totaling 2,000 personnel in two brigades was deployed for the mission. The total Nationalist force committed was just over 10,000.  The Nationalists had hoped to turn the island into a stronghold near the enemy and use it as a steppingstone to launch strikes against the mainland, but many capable Nationalist commanders (including the commander of the operation, Hu Lien) were highly doubtful this would ever succeed. After fierce debate, a compromise was reached: a much more moderate objective of striking the island to gain a political and morale boost and then a quick withdrawal before the enemy could reinforce the island.  Later, when the situation permitted, the original plan to turn the island into a stronghold would be implemented.

The Communist local defense, consisting of the 80th Public Security Regiment and militia totaling 1,200 men, was obviously outnumbered, so the Communist commander Ye Fei instructed the local garrison commander You Meiyao (游梅耀) to decide what was best, giving him the option of withdrawing if necessary and counterattacking later.

You Meiyao, a staff officer of Chen Yi during the Second Sino-Japanese War, refused to withdraw because that would allow the Nationalists to occupy the Communist fortifications on the island, making future attempts to dislodge the Nationalists very difficult. You Meiyao suggested that while reinforcements were organized as quickly as possible, the local garrison would use the terrain and fortifications on the island to slow the enemy down by inflicting as many casualties as possible. Once the attackers were exhausted, the defenders would counterattack with reinforcements.

First stage
The first shot of the campaign was fired at 5:00 AM on July 16, 1953, when a Nationalist division landed on the island.  After three hours of fierce fighting, the Communists' first line of defense was breached, and the Nationalists had succeeded in forcing them into their second line of defense.  By the end of the day, the Nationalists had successfully taken the largest port on the island and controlled most of the island.  However, the Communist resistance in the few remaining isolated pockets proved to be much stronger than anticipated.

Communist mortar fire badly damaged the port facilities including the pier and also scored direct hits on three large landing ships.  Although the mortar rounds themselves were not powerful enough to completely destroy the landing ships which carried heavy weaponry and ammunition, the secondary explosions triggered by the direct hits by the PLA heavy mortars were enough to sink all three landing ships. Since the motorized junks with shallow draft were not severely affected by the wreckage, the Nationalists were still able to transport personnel onto the island via these junks, but ships carrying heavy weaponry were effectively blocked due to greater draft.  The Nationalists, however, did not consider the problem to be serious because the defenders were mostly light infantry anyway, a mistake that they would later deeply regret.  In addition to failing to realize the problem caused, the Nationalists were not able to take the highest point of the island from the Communists and although most of the PLA heavy mortars were knocked out with air support, the surviving ones did not stop shelling the Nationalists until the last round of ammunition had been exhausted.

The other Communist stronghold left on the island was in the region of Eight Feet Gate (Ba Chi Men, 八尺门), which faced the mainland, defended by a single company of Communist naval infantry.  The strongly fortified position included a pier and thus was the critical steppingstone for Communist reinforcement from the mainland.  The Nationalists had correctly identified this serious threat and had also correctly decided to eliminate this threat early on, so the entire American trained paratroop division which reached the island first was devoted to the mission.  However, the lightly armed paratroopers proved to be no match for the enemy in heavily fortified positions on the terrain that strongly favored the defenders.  Despite repeated assaults, the elite paratroopers not only failed to achieve their original objective but suffered heavy losses, with several hundred killed and wounded.  The lack of heavy weaponry was the main cause of the Nationalist failure to take this very important position, which paved the way for the eventual Nationalist defeat in the campaign.  Unable to take either of the two remaining Communist strongholds on the island, the Nationalist advance halted.

Second stage
Communist units on the mainland reacted rapidly by mobilizing all available vehicles to transport troops to the front.  The Communist 272nd Regiment of the 31st Army at Zhangpu County was first to respond: by 5:50 AM, less than an hour after the first shot of the campaign was fired, the advance guard of the regiment was already on its way to the front in the few military vehicles available, while the rest of the regiment commandeered every civilian vehicle on the road.  By 9:00 AM, the entire regiment had reached the Eight Feet Gate (Ba Chi Men, 八尺门) pier of the Eastern Mountain (Dongshan, 东山) Island.  With the help of the newly arrived reinforcements, the Communist naval infantry company at Eight Feet Gate managed to force the attacking Nationalist paratroopers into retreat.  Two regiments of the Communist 28th Army and 41st Army arrived soon afterward. The Communist commander You Meiyao, building on his initial success in repelling the attacking Nationalist paratroopers, successfully counterattacked before the Nationalists had time to regroup.  As the Nationalists were forced back by the counterattack, the Communist 91st Division of the 31st Army landed on the island under the commander of the 31st Army, Zhou Zhijian (周志坚).

The Nationalist commander of the operation, Hu Lien, initially did not believe that the Communists could reinforce the island on such a large scale and in such short time, since the vital Nine Dragons Bridge (Jiulong Jiang Daqiao, 九龙江大桥) was already destroyed by the Nationalist air force.  Realizing that his force was now outnumbered and outgunned, Hu Lien chose to withdraw before any more enemy reinforcements arrived. The Communists, in turn, seeing that they were successfully forcing the Nationalists off the island, did not pursue and stopped sending reinforcements.  The campaign came to an end on July 18, 1953, after the island was secured by the defenders.

Outcome
The Dongshan Island Campaign was the last large scale Nationalist counterattack against the mainland. Nationalist dead recovered by the Communists on land and in the coastal waters totaled 2,664, and another 715 were captured, while the number of wounded was uncertain because most of them were successfully evacuated by the Nationalists themselves.  In addition, two tanks were destroyed, three landing ships sunk and two aircraft were also lost.

The Kuomintang went too far to maintain the secrecy of the mission. Even their own troops were not informed about the mission until they were already on their way to the island.  Many captured Nationalist officers felt that they had been handicapped by inadequate briefing. Had they been better informed, they would have postponed the attack to better train their troops.

The poor Nationalist inter-service communication caused by the excessive secrecy also resulted in the Nationalist landing ships unloading in the largest port on the island, which was within range of the PLA heavy mortar positions.  The slow landing ships loaded with heavy weaponry became sitting ducks as they were being unloaded, and in addition to three being sunk, the pier was also badly damaged by the accurate mortar fire.

Another serious blunder committed by the attacking Nationalist force was the failure to cut the communications link between the defenders and the mainland.  Despite the fact that every single telephone line pole was cut down, nobody bothered to cut the actual line, or to wiretap the enemy's telephone line.  As a result, the defenders were able to maintain communications with the mainland and the Communist commanders were much more aware of the situation than their Nationalist counterparts.

The attacking Nationalist forces underestimated the speed and size of the Communist response.  Although the Nationalist order of battle included three divisions, none of them were full strength, and the elite paratrooper division comprised two brigades totaling only 2,000 men, which was the usual strength of a single brigade.  Furthermore, due to the sinking of three landing ships at the port and the destruction of the port by enemy heavy mortar fire, most landing forces became light infantry without firepower superior to that of their opponents.  This problem was further compounded by the incorrect use of the paratroopers by ordering them to attack the strongly fortified Communist positions at Eight Feet Gate Pier, resulting in more than 500 paratroopers killed, a staggering 25% of the total paratroop force devoted to the campaign.  After losing their superiority in firepower with the destruction of their heavy weapons at the port, the Nationalists lost their superiority in numbers as the Communists reinforced their garrison from the mainland.

In addition to underestimating how quickly the Communists would send reinforcements, the Nationalists also underestimated how quickly the Communists would repair the damage caused by airstrikes to the vital Nine Dragons Bridge. Nationalist intelligence estimated it would take at least two days, but in reality, the Communists had the bridge repaired in only two hours. As the news reached the surprised Nationalists, it was obvious that the mission was over and the Nationalists chose to withdraw from the island.

See also
List of Battles of Chinese Civil War
Project National Glory
National Revolutionary Army
History of the People's Liberation Army
Chinese Civil War

References
Zhu, Zongzhen and Wang, Chaoguang, Liberation War History, 1st Edition, Social Scientific Literary Publishing House in Beijing, 2000,  (set)
Zhang, Ping, History of the Liberation War, 1st Edition, Chinese Youth Publishing House in Beijing, 1987,  (pbk.)
Jie, Lifu, Records of the Liberation War: The Decisive Battle of Two Kinds of Fates, 1st Edition, Hebei People's Publishing House in Shijiazhuang, 1990,  (set)
Literary and Historical Research Committee of the Anhui Committee of the Chinese People's Political Consultative Conference, Liberation War, 1st Edition, Anhui People's Publishing House in Hefei, 1987, 
Li, Zuomin, Heroic Division and Iron Horse: Records of the Liberation War, 1st Edition, Chinese Communist Party History Publishing House in Beijing, 2004, 
Wang, Xingsheng, and Zhang, Jingshan, Chinese Liberation War, 1st Edition, People's Liberation Army Literature and Art Publishing House in Beijing, 2001,  (set)
Huang, Youlan, History of the Chinese People's Liberation War, 1st Edition, Archives Publishing House in Beijing, 1992, 
Liu Wusheng, From Yan'an to Beijing: A Collection of Military Records and Research Publications of Important Campaigns in the Liberation War, 1st Edition, Central Literary Publishing House in Beijing, 1993, 
Tang, Yilu and Bi, Jianzhong, History of Chinese People's Liberation Army in Chinese Liberation War, 1st Edition, Military Scientific Publishing House in Beijing, 1993 – 1997,  (Volume 1), 7800219615 (Volume 2), 7800219631 (Volume 3), 7801370937 (Volume 4), and 7801370953 (Volume 5)

Conflicts in 1953
Campaigns of the Chinese Civil War
1953 in China
Military history of Fujian
Military history of Taiwan